Osame Sahraoui (born 11 June 2001) is a Norwegian professional footballer who plays as a left winger for Eredivisie club SC Heerenveen.

Club career

Vålerenga
Growing up in Hauketo IF, he joined Vålerenga's youth system in 2014. Steadily advancing in the junior ranks, he made his senior debut in June 2020 against Stabæk, where he provoked a penalty kick that equalised the match.

SC Heerenveen
On 31 January 2023, Sahraoui signed a three and a half year contract with Eredivisie club SC Heerenveen. He made his debut for the club the very next game on 4 Februari against FC Utrecht which resulted in a 1-0 defeat.

International career
Born in Norway, Sahraoui is of Moroccan descent. He has been called up to a training camp for Morocco youth national teams.

On 8 October 2021, Sahraoui gained his first cap for the Norway U21 in a match against Croatia.

Career statistics

References

2001 births
Norwegian people of Moroccan descent
Footballers from Oslo
Living people
Norwegian footballers
Norway under-21 international footballers
Association football midfielders
Vålerenga Fotball players
SC Heerenveen players
Eliteserien players
Eredivisie players
Norwegian expatriate footballers
Expatriate footballers in the Netherlands
Norwegian expatriate sportspeople in the Netherlands